Martin Van Buren (1782–1862) was the president of the United States from 1837 to 1841.

Van Buren may also refer to:

People
Van Buren (surname)

Places

United States
 Van Buren County, Arkansas
 Van Buren County, Iowa
 Van Buren County, Michigan
 Van Buren County, Tennessee
 Van Buren, Arkansas
 Van Buren, Louisiana
 Van Buren, Indiana
 Van Buren, Maine, a New England town
 Van Buren (CDP), Maine, the main village in the town
 Van Buren Township, Michigan
 Van Buren, Missouri
 Van Buren, New York
 Van Buren, Ohio
 Van Buren, Tennessee
 Van Buren, Wisconsin
 Van Buren Lake, a lake in Ohio

Buildings
 Van Buren, Martin, National Historic Site, United States

Law 

 Van Buren v. United States, a United States Supreme Court case

Ships
 , United States Navy ships of the name
 USS Van Buren (1839), a schooner that served in the U.S. Revenue Cutter Service and U.S. Navy
 USS Van Buren (PF-42), U.S. Navy frigate
 USS John J. Van Buren (DE-753), a United States Navy destroyer escort cancelled in 1944

Video games
 Van Buren (video game), the codename given to Interplay's canceled third Fallout video game

See also
 Armin van Buuren (born 1976), Dutch music producer and DJ
 Buren (disambiguation)
 Büren (disambiguation)
 Van Beuren Studios, an American animation studio that produced theatrical cartoons from 1928 to 1936
 Van Buren Township (disambiguation)